Alvados is a former civil parish in the municipality of Porto de Mós, Portugal. The population in 2011 was 497, in an area of 10.3 km2. On 28 January 2013 it merged with Alcaria to form Alvados e Alcaria.It's known for its grottoes Grutas de Alvados and Grutas de Santo António (discovered in 1964 and 1955 respectively).

References 

Former parishes of Porto de Mós